Scaphinotus unicolor is a species of ground beetle in the family Carabidae. It is found in North America.

Subspecies
These four subspecies belong to the species Scaphinotus unicolor:
 Scaphinotus unicolor floridanus Leng, 1915
 Scaphinotus unicolor heros T.W.Harris, 1839
 Scaphinotus unicolor shoemakeri Leng, 1914
 Scaphinotus unicolor unicolor (Fabricius, 1787)

References

Further reading

 

Carabinae
Articles created by Qbugbot
Beetles described in 1787